Atethmia is a genus of moths of the family Noctuidae. The genus was erected by Jacob Hübner in 1821.

Species
 Atethmia algirica (Culot, 1917)
 Atethmia ambusta (Denis & Schiffermüller, 1775)
 Atethmia centrago (Haworth, 1809) – center-barred sallow
 Atethmia obscura Osthelder, 1933
 Atethmia pinkeri (Boursin, 1970)
 Atethmia sinuata L.Ronkay & Gyulai, 2006

References

 Ronkay, L. & Gyulai, P. (2006). "New Noctuidae (Lepidoptera) species from Iran and Tibet Esperiana". Buchreihe zur Entomologie. 12: 211-241.

Cuculliinae
Moth genera